Vitro is the largest glass producer in Mexico and one of the world's largest organizations in the glass industry. Founded in 1909 in Monterrey, Mexico, this corporation has 30 subsidiaries in Mexico, United States, Brazil, Colombia, Bolivia, Costa Rica, Guatemala and Panama.

Its companies produce, distribute, and market a wide range of glass articles, which are part of the daily life of millions of people in 34 countries in the Americas, Europe and Asia. It was founded by Roberto Sada Muguerza in 1909. It is one of the world's largest glass producers. In 2015 it sold its part of glass bottles to Owens Illinois for $2.15 billion. Vitro now focuses on producing flat glass.

References

Companies based in Mexico City
Manufacturing companies established in 1909
Mexican companies established in 1909
Mexican brands